Arnold Marc Gorter (1866, Almelo – 1933, Amsterdam), was a 19th-century landscape painter from the Eastern Netherlands.

Biography
According to the RKD he was a pupil of August Allebé and Pierre Cuypers at the Rijksnormaalschool voor Teekenonderwijzers in Amsterdam in 1888, and the Rijksakademie van beeldende kunsten there in (1889-1891). He was a member of the Pulchri studio and Arti et Amicitiae. A president of the artists' association Arti et Amicitiae, he was a favorite of the Dutch Queen Wilhelmina.

Gorter is known for landscapes and won a gold medal at the Paris salon in 1910. In 1922 he accompanied Wilhelmina of the Netherlands on a trip to Norway as her painting teacher. Other less famous pupils of Gorter were Marinus Bies, Carel Lodewijk Dake, his niece Hinke Gorter, Maria Elisabeth van Hengel, Albertus Gerhard Hulshoff Pol, Johan Meijer(1885-1970), Leendert Johan Muller, and Henri van Os-Delhez.

Works of Art 

 
 A Brook In A Forest 
 A Cowherdress With Her Cattle
 A Forest Pond
 A Moonlit Winterlandscape
 A Mother and Child Strolling Along a Waterway
 A Stream in Snow Covered Woods
 A View of the Vordense Beek
 A View of the Vordense Beek 2
 An Autumn Landscape, Vordense Beek
 An Autumn Landscape 2
 An Orchard in Spring
 Autumn
 Birch Trees in Autumn
 Birches Along the Vordense Beek
 Birches in Autumn
 Brook in a Forest
 Canal Landscape With Trees
 Cows Grazing Along a Stream
 Cows Grazing By A Stream In A Wooded Landscape
 Cows Grazing Near the Vordense Beek
 Cows in a Forest Landscape
 Cows in a Sunny Autumn Landscape
 Cows on a Birchpath
 Ducks in a Meadow, in Spring
 Early Spring
 Herfstgoud Beech Trees in Autumn
 Homeward Bound
 Homeward Bound in Winter
 Leading the Cattle Along a Country Track
 Sheep in a Sunny Autumn Landscape
 The Vordense Beek
 The Vordense Beek 2
 The Vordense Beek 3
 The Vordense Beek 4
 The Vordense Beek 5
 The Vordense Beek 6
 The Vordense Beek in Autumn
 The Vordense Beek in Autumn 2
 The Vordense Beek in Winter
 Vordense Beek Cows in a Meadow Near a Stream

References

External links
Arnold Marc Gorter on Artnet
Crocker Art Museum

1866 births
1933 deaths
19th-century Dutch painters
Dutch male painters
People from Almelo
20th-century Dutch painters
19th-century Dutch male artists
20th-century Dutch male artists